Forest City is a populated place in Washington County, Maine, United States.

The community has the unusual distinction of sharing its name with the community of Forest City immediately across the Canada–United States border in the province of New Brunswick.

The community houses the Forest City Border Crossing and a small water control dam on the Chiputneticook Lakes.

Notes

Unincorporated communities in Washington County, Maine
Unincorporated communities in Maine
Divided cities